(Once Upon a Time... Space) is an animated science fiction television series from 1982 until 1983, directed by Albert Barillé. It is part of the Once Upon a Time... franchise.

The show was animated in Japan by the animation studio Eiken, and is thus considered to be anime as it also aired on Japanese television, albeit not until 1984, under the title Ginga Patrol PJ (Galaxy Patrol PJ). In contrast to the show's success in the West, the series' Japanese broadcast was consigned to an early-morning time slot and attracted little attention. Though it did gain some kind of success in Japan the following years.

Synopsis
Unlike the rest of the Once Upon a Time... titles, Once Upon a Time... Space revolve around a fictional  premise rather than an edutainment theme. The series still has a handful of educational information (such as an episode discussing the rings of the planet Saturn) but nowhere as prevalent as its predecessor Once Upon a Time... Man nor its successor Once Upon a Time... Life.

The series succeeds Once Upon a Time... Man. It reprises almost all of the characters from the past series and adapts them into a science-fiction context.

The story is about the confrontation between several galactic powers. Among them there is the Omega Confederation (of which Earth is a member), the military Republic of Cassiopeia (led by General The Pest) and a powerful supercomputer which controls an army of robots. A group of super powerful creatures called the Humanoids later appear in the series.

The show follows the adventures of space police members Pierrot and Mercedes (aka Psi). Pierrot is the son of Colonel Pierre and President Pierrette. The series has a more egalitarian message than its predecessor as the supreme leader of the good guys is a female President and Psi is a co-protagonist. The previous series instead focused on male protagonists.

The scenarios of several episodes adapt elements of Greek mythology, other mythologies, and European legends. Among them are the Apple of Discord, Atlantis, David and Goliath, the Olympian Gods, and Prometheus. Other episodes deal with the existence of God, the relationship of man with modernity and machines, the limits of technology, comparisons between armed peace under the rule of a dictator and the difficulty of maintaining order in a democracy, higher spiritual beings encountered at the beginning and the end of the series etc. Some planets visited by the characters are replicas of the Earth at a specific era in its history, thus allowing some didactic interludes over the nature of these eras.

The series contains little to no violence, the heroes mostly use non-lethal stun weapons in combat. The exception is the use of disintegrating laser beams against wild animals.

The Earth does not play a central role in this series. The capital of the Confederation is on the planet Omega, far from Earth. The Confederation consists of multiple allied powers: Aldebaran, Auriga, Cassiopeia, Hydra, Scorpio, and Vega. The Confederation has a democratically elected government and a President.

Cast
Colonel Pierre ... Roger Carel 
President Pierrette ... Annie Balestra
Lieutenant/Captain Peter ... Vincent Ropion
Psi (Mercedes) ... Annie Balestra
Positronic brain android Métro ... Roger Carel
Commander Jumbo ... Alain Dorval
Petit Gros
Grand Ordinateur
Professor Maestro ... Roger Carel  
20th century Maestro
General The Pest ... Alain Dorval
The Dwarf ... Roger Carel

Spacecraft
The French illustrator Philippe Bouchet (better known as Manchu) worked on some of the spacecraft and set designs.

Omega Confederation:
Flea
Hummingbird
Spider
Dragonfly
Blue bird
Omega Cruiser
Omega Shuttle
Cosmopolitan

Cassiopeia:
Nautilus
Murene
Battle cruiser

Earth:
Ursus

Episodes

Characters
The series features the following characters. 
Colonel Pierre. He is the head of the Omega Space Police and the husband of the President of the Confederation. He is a happily married man, strict and highly moral. 
Pierrette. President of the Omega Confederation, wife of Pierre, and mother of Pierrot. She is a smiling figure and a skilled politician. She governs by building consensus among Council members. 
Pierrot . He is the son of Colonel Pierre and President Pierrette. He joined the Space Police of the Omega Confederation after completing his studies. He finds himself in command of a dragonfly-type vessel. He starts the series with the rank of lieutenant, and he later becomes a captain. His promotion is a reward for his bravery in saving the Earth from an attack by a remote-controlled rocket. He is a kind, brave man with a curious mind and a thirst for discovery.
Mercedes, nicknamed "Psi". She is a young Hispanic woman, calm and involved. She is particularly intuitive, precognitive, a telepath, and a skilled hypnotist. She tries repeatedly to convince Pierrot that her precognitions are both relevant and accurate. He initially distrusts her visions, a source of conflict among them. Gradually, Pierrot comes to trust her more. The characters are love interests to each other. She is very unwilling to kill, preferring to use her weapons to stun and paralyze enemies. She has great respect for living things. However, she is aware of the malice and deceit of Naboth. Psi is of South American, and especially Brazilian descent according to the official website of the series as stated in the Once Upon A Time... Planet Earth section. At many times, the character said herself what she has a specialization into geology.
Metro. A robot, specifically an "android positronic brain". He is the robotic equivalent of Professor Maestro, that is to explain, he is a scholar among the robots. He manages to defeat opponents by cunning. He was created by Maestro, but Metro thinks (rightly) that he is both more resourceful and intelligent than its creator. He has the same personality as his creator, he is whiny, classic, doting and with great curiosity to know the functioning of humanity. He accompanies Pierrot and Psi in their patrols and helps out in perilous situations. He was destroyed in a crash and would be recreated. He is a great help for the police officers as he highlights the peculiarities of visited worlds. 
Commander Jumbo. He serves under Colonel Pierre. He is direct and impulsive, preferring a good fight than endless discussions. He doesn't hide his aversion to members of the Cassiopeian government.
Professor Maestro. He is a scholar, the dean of the Omega Confederation. He has an advisory capacity to the council. Doting, grumpy. He is the voice of wisdom but tends to give overly technical statements. Consequently, he is often cut off when speaking. He is the creator of Metro, which he made in his image. There is some amusing tension between creator and creation. The main Omega Fleet vessels are also created by the Master.
Little Jumbo. He is the best friend of Pierrot. They followed the training course of the Police Academy together, and they know each other for a long time. He is the son of Commander Jumbo and he inherited the same temperament as his father, namely a preference for fights. He has a non-standard physic, and incredible strength. He is somewhat unbalanced, but kind at heart. 
Pierrot's sister . Called Little Pierrette in the French dub. Despite featuring in the end credits, she mostly gets minor appearances. She is actually paired with Little Jumbo.
General The Pest. He is the supreme head of the constellation Cassiopeia. He is an aggressive, authoritarian, stupid, and narrow-minded man. He lacks in common sense and wants above all to annex the rest of the universe. He is the archetypal villain. Although he managed to rise to power by election, he does not respect the rules of democracy and dismisses the members of the council when they oppose his decisions. He believes he manipulates the forces of the Great computer, while it is indeed he who is manipulated. He represents a member state of the Omega Confederation, but President Pierrette has to devote great efforts to keep him in check. She switches tactics between diplomacy and intimidation to reason with him.
The Dwarf. He is the consul of Cassiopeia and representative of the General The Pest to the Omega Council, until the departure of Cassiopeia from the Confederation. He is the chief advisor to The Pest, but he is smarter than his master. He manipulates his leader and pulls the strings. He understands that Psi has strange powers and wants to keep her activities monitored.
The Great Computer. He appears towards the end of the series (ep.21). He is the mastermind of the Humanoids. He is a villain with noble motives, as he wants to prevent humans from making war. But he pursues this goal beyond the point of reason and imposes a totalitarian dictatorship. He was created by an Earth scientist who was tired of conflicts. At the end of his life, the scientist programmed his creation to pursue this goal. Never questioning this goal, the Computer uses radical means to trigger the greatest disaster of the universe. He is the symbol of the cold methodical machines, which cannot properly replace human judgment.
Maestro of the 20th century. He is an Earth man who was placed under hibernation at the beginning of the 21st century. He stays like this for about a millennium and then wakes up in planet Omega.

Broadcast information

* Production company** Contributing co-producer

See also
 List of French animated television series

References

External links
 Official website by Procidis, the series' producer
 French theme song
 Hello Maestro at YouTube
 
 
 

1980s French animated television series
1982 French television series debuts
1982 French television series endings
1984 anime television series debuts
1984 Japanese television series endings
Animated television series about robots
Fiction set around Aldebaran
French children's animated education television series
French children's animated space adventure television series
Eiken (studio)
Fuji TV original programming
Science education television series
1982 Japanese television series debuts
Television series about ancient astronauts
Television series set in the future
Fiction set around Vega